Chah Abu ol Fazl (also Romanized as Chāh Abū ol Faẕl) is a village in Chahak Rural District, in the Central District of Khatam County, Yazd Province, Iran. At the 2006 census, its population was 76, in 19 families.

References 

Populated places in Khatam County